As a nickname or part of a ring name, Kid may refer to:

Baseball
 Kid Baldwin (1864–1897), American Major League Baseball catcher
 Kid Butler (infielder) (1887–1964), American Major League Baseball infielder
 Kid Butler (outfielder) (1861–1921), American Major League Baseball outfielder
 Kid Carsey (1870–1960), professional baseball player
 Kid Carter, American pitcher in the pre-Negro leagues
 Kid Elberfeld (1875–1944), American Major League Baseball player
 Kid Gleason (1866–1933), American Major League Baseball player and manager
 Kid Madden (1866–1896), American Major League Baseball pitcher
 Kid McLaughlin (1888–1934), American Major League Baseball center fielder
 Kid Mohler (1870–1961), American Major League Baseball player
 Kid Nance (1876–1958), American Major League Baseball outfielder
 Kid Nichols (1869–1953), American Major League Baseball pitcher
 Kid O'Hara (1875–1954), American Major League Baseball outfielder
 Kid Willson (1895–1964), American Major League Baseball player

Boxing
 Kid Azteca, ring name of Mexican boxer Luis Villanueva Paramo (1913–2002)
 Jack Kid Berg, English boxer Judah Bergman (1909–1991)
 Kid Chissell (1905–1987), American boxing champion, actor, and dance marathon champion
 Kid Chocolate, ring name of Cuban boxer Eligio Sardiñas Montalvo (1910–1988)
 Kid Diamond, ring name of Kyrgyzstani boxer Almazbek Raiymkulov (born 1977)
 Kid Galahad (boxer), ring name of British boxer Abdul Bari-Awad (born 1990)
 Kid Kaplan (1901–1970), Russian-born American boxer
 Kid Lavigne (1869–1928), American world champion boxer
 Ted "Kid" Lewis (1894–1970), English boxer Gershon Mendeloff
 Kid McCoy (1872–1940), American world champion boxer born Norman Selby
 Kid Meza (born 1956), Mexican world champion boxer
 Kid Murphy, early ring name of American boxer Jack Bernstein, born John Dodick (1899–1945)
 Jack "Kid" Wolfe (1895–1975), American boxer, first junior featherweight world champion

Music
 Kid Howard (1908–1966), American jazz trumpeter associated with the New Orleans jazz scene
 Kid Ory (1886–1973), American jazz trombonist and bandleader
 Kid Rena (1898–1949), American jazz trumpeter

Other
 Kid Shanahan (1873–1883), American criminal, river pirate, and member of the Patsy Conroy Gang

See also 

Kidd (surname)